Dioryctria magnifica is a species of snout moth in the genus Dioryctria. It was described by Eugene G. Munroe in 1958 and is known from China.

References

Moths described in 1958
magnifica